Carolus Petrus Eduardus Maria "Karel" van de Woestijne (Ghent, 10 March 1878 – Zwijnaarde, 24 August 1929) was a Flemish writer and brother of the painter Gustave van de Woestijne. He went to highschool at the Koninklijk Athenaeum (E:Royal Athenaeum) at the Ottogracht in Ghent. He also studied Germanic philology at the University of Ghent, where he came into contact with French symbolism. He lived at Sint-Martens-Latem from April 1900 up to January 1904, and from April 1905 up to November 1906. Here he wrote Laetemsche brieven over de lente, for his friend Adolf Herckenrath (1901). In 1907 he moved to Brussels, and in 1915 he moved to Pamel, where he wrote De leemen torens together with Herman Teirlinck.

 
From 1906 he was correspondent of the Nieuwe Rotterdamsche Courant in Brussels. Between 1920 and 1929 he taught history of Dutch literature at the University of Ghent. He was editor of successively the illustrated magazines of Van Nu en Straks (second range, 1896-1901) and Vlaanderen (1903-1907). Of the illustrated magazine Vlaanderen he became secretary of the redaction in 1906. From 1925 until his death in 1929, he lived in Zwijnaarde, nearby Ghent. He was buried in the Cemetery of Campo Santo.

Honours 
 1923 : Officer in the Order of the Crown.

Bibliography

 Laethemse brieven over de lente (1901) 
 Het Vaderhuis (1903) 
 De boomgaard der vogelen en der vruchten (1905) 
 Janus met het dubbele voorhoofd (1908) 
 De gulden schaduw (1910) 
 Afwijkingen (1910) 
 Kunst en geest in Vlaanderen (1911) 
 Interludiën I (1912) 
 Interludiën II (1914) 
 De boer die sterft (1918) (translated by Paul Vincent as The Dying Peasant, 2018)
 Goddelijke verbeeldingen (1918) 
 De bestendige aanwezigheid (1918) 
 De modderen man (1920) 
 Substrata (1924) 
 Zon in de rug (1924) 
 Beginselen der chemie (1925) 
 God aan zee (1926) 
 Het menschelijk brood (1923) 
 Christophorus (1926) 
 Het zatte hart (1926) 
 Epibasis (1927-1929) 
 De leemen torens (1928) 
 De schroeflijn (1928) 
 Het bergmeer (1928)
 De nieuwe Esopet (1932) 
 Over schrijvers en boeken (1933) 
 Proza (omvattend : De boer die sterft, Christophorus, De heilige van het getal) (1933) 
 Verzameld werk (1928-1933)
 Een bundeltje lyrische gedichten (1936 en 1950)
 Romeo of De minnaar der liefde (1941)
 Proza (omvattend : De boer die sterft, Goddelijke verbeeldingen I) (1942) 
 Nagelaten gedichten (1943) 
 Verhalen (1944) 
 Verzameld werk (8 delen, 1948-1950) 
 Verzamelde gedichten (1953)
 Keur uit het werk van Karel Van de Woestijne (1953)
 Journalistiek. Brieven aan de Nieuwe Rotterdamsche Courant 
 Verzamelde gedichten (1978) 
 Brieven aan Lode Outrop (1985)

See also
 Flemish literature

Sources
 Karel van de Woestijne
 Karel van de Woestijne

Specific

1878 births
1929 deaths
Writers from Ghent
Ghent University alumni
Officers of the Order of the Crown (Belgium)
Belgian writers
19th-century Belgian novelists
19th-century Belgian male writers
20th-century Belgian novelists
20th-century Belgian male writers
Symbolist poets
Symbolist writers